Gary Joseph McKeown (born 19 October 1970) is an English retired professional footballer. He played in midfield for various clubs in England, Scotland, Hong Kong and Greece.

References

External links

Gary McKeown at The Grecian Archive
McKeown's stock rises in Hong Kong The Scotsman, 22 May 2002

Living people
1970 births
Footballers from Oxford
English footballers
English people of Scottish descent
Association football midfielders
Arsenal F.C. players
Shrewsbury Town F.C. players
Dundee F.C. players
Exeter City F.C. players
Yee Hope players
Hong Kong Rangers FC players
Sun Hei SC players
Apollon Pontou FC players
Bishop's Stortford F.C. players
Wealdstone F.C. players
English Football League players
Scottish Football League players
Hong Kong First Division League players
Expatriate footballers in Hong Kong
English expatriate sportspeople in Hong Kong
English expatriate footballers
Hong Kong League XI representative players